This is a list of the French SNEP Top 200 Singles and Top 200 Albums number-ones of 2018.

Number ones by week

Singles chart

Albums chart

See also
2018 in music
List of number-one hits (France)
List of top 10 singles in 2018 (France)

References

France
2018
2018 in French music